Adrián Di Monte (born July 31, 1990) is a Cuban television actor and singer.

Life and career 
Adrián Di Monte was born in Santa Clara, Cuba. He started his acting career in 2010 with a role in the Univision telenovela, Eva Luna. He later appeared in another telenovela of Telemundo called Aurora, and then in Mi corazón insiste en Lola Volcán, and in 2013 was cast in the recurring role in the Univision telenovela Rosario, playing Ignacio "Nacho" Gómez. In 2014, he appeared on Cosita linda and Voltea pa' que te enamores, an American remake of the Venezuelan telenovelas Cosita rica and Voltea pa' que te enamores. In 2015, he appeared on ¿Quién es quién?, playing Eugenio Hernández. In 2016, he was part of the recurring cast of the series Señora Acero, also known as Señora Acero: La Coyote, playing Abelardo Casáres.

Filmography

References

External links 
 

1990 births
Living people
Cuban male television actors
Cuban male telenovela actors
21st-century Cuban male actors